Alya is a female name that originates from Ancient Greek, Slavonic, Hebrew, and Arabic.

In Russia, Alya is typically used as a colloquial name by people named Albina, Alina, Alevtina, Alexandra. It is formed in a manner similar to other colloquial Russian names (for example, Kostya for Konstantin, Anya for Anna).

In Arabic, Alya means sky, heaven, and loftiness.

In Hebrew, Alya means to ascend, to go up.

In Slavonic, Alya is derived from the word алая ("scarlet") in the meaning of "beautiful".

In Turkish, Alya means sky.

In Sanskrit, Alya (आल्या) means “dwelling place" or "abode”, most often associated with the Buddhist phrase “ālya-vijñāna” which roughly translates to the "Abode of consciousness”.

Notable people with the name
Alya (singer), Slovenian singer
Alya bint Ahmed Al Thani, Qatari diplomat
Alya Bakhshal, Pakistani feminist political worker
Alya Hassan, Emirati volleyball player
Alya Michelson, Russian singer/songwriter
Alya Mooro, Egyptian journalist
Alya Nurshabrina, Indonesian model
Alya Rohali, Indonesian actress

Fictional characters
Alya Césaire, a character in Miraculous: Tales of Ladybug & Cat Noir, the best friend of female protagonist Marinette Dupain-Cheng

See also
Aliya, given name

References

Russian feminine given names
Feminine given names
Hebrew feminine given names
Arabic feminine given names